Ágúst Ögmundsson (born 23 April 1946) is an Icelandic former handball player who competed in the 1972 Summer Olympics.

References

1946 births
Living people
Agust Ogmundsson
Agust Ogmundsson
Handball players at the 1972 Summer Olympics